Yazıpınarı is a village in the Elazığ District of Elazığ Province in Turkey. The village is populated by Kurds. Its population is 41 (2021).

References

Villages in Elazığ District
Kurdish settlements in Elazığ Province